CKFX-FM is a Canadian radio station, which broadcasts at 101.9 FM in North Bay, Ontario. The station airs a mainstream rock format under the brand name 101.9 Rock. The station uses the same general format as, and shares some programming with, CJRQ-FM in Sudbury and CJQQ-FM in Timmins.

History
The station was originally launched in Iroquois Falls in 1922, as CFCH, a corporate communications service for lumber camps owned by Abitibi Power and Paper Company. It was subsequently acquired by Roy Thomson in 1930, and moved to North Bay. The station originally launched in North Bay at 930 on the AM dial, moving to 1230 in 1941 and then to 600 in 1942. CFCH was on the FM dial at 106.3 MHz for a brief period in the 1940s and 1950s. The 106.3 MHz frequency is now occupied by CFXN-FM.

In 1960, Thomson's Northern Broadcasting acquired the city's television station, CKGN, which also adopted the CFCH callsign. In 1976, Northern also acquired the FM station CKAT. Thomson subsequently sold Northern Broadcasting to a local business consortium in 1974. In 1980, the stations were sold to Telemedia.

CFCH was an affiliate of the Canadian Broadcasting Corporation's Trans-Canada Network and then of CBC Radio, until 1976 when CBCN-FM launched.

In 1996, Telemedia swapped the stations in a move similar to its 1990 switch involving CKSO and CIGM in Sudbury. CKAT took over CFCH's AM frequency, and CFCH moved to the FM station, adopted its current CKFX-FM callsign and a new branding 102 FM The Fox. (The former CFCH callsign recently belonged to a radio station out in Chase, British Columbia. The heritage CFCH call sign returned in North Bay at a radio station (as CFCH-FM) that was launched by Vista Broadcast Group at 90.5 FM on June 15, 2021).

In 2002, Telemedia sold the stations to Standard Broadcasting, who shortly sold them to Rogers Communications.

In June 2013, Rogers Communications rebranded 102 FM The Fox to 101.9 The Fox and changing the slogan from "North Bay's Best Rock" to "World Class Rock."

On June 7, 2016, the station was rebranded 101.9 Rock.

See also
CFCH

References

External links
 101.9 Rock
 North Bay History
 

Kfx
Kfx
Kfx
Radio stations established in 1922
1922 establishments in Ontario